International Mission to Jewish People formerly Christian Witness to Israel (CWI) is a Protestant Christian organization dedicated to the evangelisation of Jewish people. It was founded in 1976 as a merger between the International Society for Evangelisation of the Jews and the Barbican Mission to the Jews.

The International Society for the Evangelization of the Jews (IJS) was founded in 1842 as the British Society for the Propagation of the Gospel Among the Jews. It published a periodical called The Jewish Missionary Herald.

The Barbican Mission to the Jews (BMJ) was founded in 1879. It operated in the East End of London, and was run by Jewish Christians. BMJ was also involved in the Kindertransport, and supported the rescue of about a hundred Jewish children to England prior to World War II.

Both pre- and post-millennial theology inspired the early Christian Zionists who established and ran the two progenitor societies.

IMJP has workers in Israel, the United Kingdom, France, Holland, Hungary, Bulgaria, Australia, New Zealand, Hong Kong and the United States. It considers that the Bible "gives a special place to Jewish evangelism".

See also
 Conversion of the Jews
 Proselytization and counter-proselytization of Jews

References

Conversion of Jews to Christianity
Christian organizations established in 1976